Eleonora Johanna "Ellen" van der Weijden-Bast (born 29 August 1971) was a Dutch former water polo player. She was a member of the Netherlands women's national water polo team.

She competed with the team at the 2000 Summer Olympics and also at World Championships including the 1998 World Aquatics Championships.

See also
 List of World Aquatics Championships medalists in water polo

References

External links
 

1971 births
Living people
Dutch female water polo players
Water polo players at the 2000 Summer Olympics
Olympic water polo players of the Netherlands
Sportspeople from Gouda, South Holland